Charaxes catachrous, the silvery demon charaxes, is a butterfly in the family Nymphalidae. It is found in Nigeria, Cameroon, the Republic of the Congo, the Central African Republic, the Democratic Republic of the Congo, Uganda, north-western Tanzania and Zambia. The habitat consists of wet riverine and swamp forests.

The larvae feed on Scutia myrtina.

Taxonomy
Charaxes catachrous is a member of the Charaxes etheocles species group.
It is similar to Charaxes grahamei on the underside, but a smaller insect.

References

van Someren. V.G.L., 1969 Revisional notes on African Charaxes (Lepidoptera: Nymphalidae). Part V. Bulletin of the British Museum (Natural History) (Entomology)75-166. page 102

External images
Charaxes catochrous images at Consortium for the Barcode of Life 
Images of C. catachrous Royal Museum for Central Africa (Albertine Rift Project)
African Butterfly Database Range map via search

Butterflies described in 1952
catachrous